Mount Usborne is a mountain on East Falkland. It is only  taller than Mount Adam, the highest peak on West Falkland.

The mountain is referenced by Charles Darwin in Chapter 9 of Zoology of the Voyage of H.M.S. Beagle.

As one of the highest mountains of the Falklands, it experienced some glaciation. The remains of glacial cirques can be seen on the mountain. The handful of Falklands mountains over  have:

"pronounced corries with small glacial lakes at their bases, morainic ridges deposited below the corries suggest that the glaciers and ice domes were confined to areas of maximum elevation with other parts of the islands experiencing a periglacial climate"

References
 Stonehouse, B (ed.) Encyclopedia of Antarctica and the Southern Oceans (2002)

External links
 A Stroll up Mount Usborne
 

Usborne